, also known as Ukishiro Castle, is a hirashiro (castle on a plain) located in Mihara, Hiroshima Prefecture, Japan.

History 
Mihara Castle was constructed in 1582 by Kobayakawa Takakage, who built this castle to protect the Mōri clan's coastline. Takakage constructed the castle on the coast, and connected it to two small islands, thus giving the castle its nickname- Ukishiro (floating castle). It had three baileys, thirty-two yagura, and fourteen gates. The tenshu (keep) was never constructed, though its foundation was completed, and is believed to be the largest ever constructed.

After Toyotomi Hideyoshi conquered Kyūshū, Takakage was rewarded for being a loyal follower by being given land in Chikuzen, Chikugo, and Bizen.  As a result, he moved to Najima Castle. However, he returned to reside at Mihara Castle following his 1595 retirement, and died there in 1597.

During the Meiji Restoration, Mihara Castle avoided the destruction that most Japanese castles suffered during this era, due primarily to the fact that it became an Imperial Japanese Naval base. However, many of the stone walls were torn down and all buildings demolished when Mihara Train Station was built in the castle in 1894 following the decommissioning of the naval base. It was further demolished in 1975, when a shinkansen station and track split what remained in half.

Today
The ruins are preserved in a park, though the shinkansen inhibits traveling around the castle. The base of the tenshu still stands and it is possible to stand on it and get a good view of Mihara City.

Gallery

See also
Niitakayama Castle : Former Kobayakawa Takakage`s prime castle

Literature

References

Literature 

　

Castles in Hiroshima Prefecture
Historic Sites of Japan
Mōri clan